Lake Darling may refer to:

Lake Darling (Minnesota), a lake in Douglas County
Lake Darling (North Dakota), a lake in northwest North Dakota near Minot.
Lake Darling Dam, a dam in North Dakota
Lake Darling State Park, a state park in southeast Iowa near Brighton.